The tornado outbreak of March 10–12, 1986 was a significant and widespread tornado outbreak which produced a high-end F2 tornado which struck Lexington, Kentucky and killing a total of 6 people. Other tornadoes struck in Alabama, Indiana, and Ohio. One tornado rated F4 in Meridian, Mississippi resulted in no fatalities.

Confirmed tornadoes

March 10 event

References

F4 tornadoes by date
Tornadoes of 1986
Tornadoes in Kentucky
Tornadoes in Ohio
1986 in Kentucky
Tornado outbreak
Tornado outbreak